Gordon House may refer to:

 Gordon House (Jamaica), seat of Parliament
 Gordon House, Chelsea, Grade II listed house in West London
 Gordon House (Silverton, Oregon), designed by Frank Lloyd Wright
 Gordon House (Irene, South Dakota)

See also
 Troy Gordon House, Fayetteville, Arkansas, listed on the National Register of Historic Places (NRHP)
 Leonard Gordon Homestead, Hexagonal Grain Crib, Twentythree, Arkansas
 J. M. Gordon House, Odessa, Delaware
 Gordon-Banks House, Newnan, Georgia, listed on the NRHP in Coweta County
 Gordon-Lee House, Chickamauga, Georgia
 David R. Gordon House, Abilene, Kansas, listed on the NRHP in Dickinson County
 Cornelia Gordon House, Louisville, Kentucky, listed on the NRHP in Jefferson County
 David Gordon House and Collins Log Cabin, Columbia, Missouri
 Lester S. and Missouri "Zue" Gordon Parker House, Jefferson City, Missouri
 Gordon House (Hamilton, Montana), listed on the NRHP in Ravalli County
 William E. Gordon House, Bellevue, Nebraska
 York-Gordon House, New Bern, North Carolina
 George W. Gordon Farm, Franklin, Pennsylvania
 John Gordon House, Williamsport, Tennessee
 Gordon-Center House, Grand Isle, Vermont
 Nealy Gordon Farm, Brush Harbor, Virginia
 Gordon-Baughan-Warren House, Richmond, Virginia